Palomar 4 is a globular cluster of the Milky Way galaxy belonging to the Palomar Globular Clusters group. It was discovered in 1949 by Edwin Hubble and again in 1955 by A. G. Wilson. Based on measurements of the stars from the Gaia spacecraft, it is at least  from the Sun.

This star cluster is further away than the SagDEG satellite galaxy.

Initially it was thought to be a dwarf galaxy, and it was given the name Ursa Major Dwarf. However, it was later discovered to be a globular cluster.

See also
 Ursa Major Dwarf

References

External links
 
 

Palomar 04
Palomar 04
Palomar 04
Local Group
UGCA objects